"Back to the Crib" is a song by American rapper Juelz Santana, intended as the second single for his unreleased third album Born to Lose, Built to Win. It features American singer-songwriter Chris Brown in their second collaboration since Chris Brown's "Run It!" in 2005. The song was produced by Polow Da Don.

Background 
After Chris Brown's publicised abuse case with singer Rihanna, Def Jam president L.A. Reid wanted Trey Songz to sing the chorus instead of Chris however Santana stuck with the chorus done by Chris Brown.

Music video
The music video directed by Clifton Bell was released December 14, 2009. Trav, Red Cafe, Tony Yayo, Lloyd Banks, DJ Envy, and Jim Jones appeared in the video. Popular models including his future wife Kimbella Vanderhee and Rosa Acosta also made appearances in the video.

Charts

References

2009 singles
2009 songs
Chris Brown songs
Juelz Santana songs
Song recordings produced by Polow da Don
Songs written by Ester Dean
Songs written by Polow da Don
Def Jam Recordings singles
Songs written by Juelz Santana